The Knights of Da Gama are a fraternal, Roman Catholic, lay society based in South Africa, for Catholic men over 18 years of age. The society is named after the Portuguese explorer Vasco da Gama. They are affiliated to the International Alliance of Catholic Knights.

References

External links
Knights of Da Gama Official Website

Fraternities and sororities in South Africa
Da Gama
Religious organisations based in South Africa
Catholic Church in South Africa